The following list shows different orders of magnitude of entropy.

See also
Orders of magnitude (data), relates to information entropy
Order of magnitude (terminology)

References

Entropy
Entropy